Paul Mpagi Sepuya (born 1982) is an American photographer and artist. His photographs focus heavily on the relationship between artist and subject. He often explores the nude in relation to the intimacy of studio photography. The foundation of Sepuya's work is portraiture. He features friends and muses in his work that creates meaningful relationships through the medium of photography. Sepuya reveals the subjects in his art in fragments:  torsos, arms, legs, or feet rather the entire body. Through provocative photography, Sepuya creates a feeling of longing and wanting more. This yearning desire allows viewers to connect deeply with the photography in a meaningful way.

Early life 
Sepuya was born in San Bernardino, California. He temporarily moved to New York to pursue a Bachelor in Fine Arts in Photography & Imaging from New York University's Tisch School of the Arts in 2004 and subsequently a Master of Fine Arts in Photography from UCLA Department of Art in 2016. Work from his master's degree was presented at the UCLA MFA Exhibition #3.

Style 
Sepuya is best known for his portraiture. Portraiture is the artist's representation of a person. The artist uses elements of art such as composition, line, or color to display the personality or mood of a person. using photographs of artists, his friends and himself. Another major feature of his work is fragmentation. Viewers are able to see parts of the body in Sepuya's portraits. Through this, he is able to create an intimate feeling of yearning for more. It is this yearning that allows viewers to connect deeply with his art. Typically his photographs are ripped apart, rearranged and taped to form a deeper meaning of the queer culture as well as social and sexual exchange. His photographs show his interest in the history of portraiture and wanting to have black photography exist in the same time space as contemporary conversations. His photography sessions mostly take place in a familiar studio like his own or a friends in order for his photographs to show his presence and his relationship with the individuals in his photographs.

Career
Sepuya's series Studio Work (2010–11) continues the development of his sustained interest in portraiture and the intimacy developed between the sitter and the photographer in the controlled environment of the studio. The range and breadth of his work examines not only the personality and character of the portrait but the private performance that exists within the photographic studio. “My studio was private, but not a closed environment. Rather, it was a stage that I inhabited and opened to those around me,” he says in reflecting on the production of the studio environment and those invited to have their portraits made. He draws inspiration for his contemporary investigations of studio photography from the works of Robert Mapplethorpe and art historian and critic Brian O'Doherty whose publication "Studio and Cube:On the relationship between where art is made and where art is displayed" both feature prominently in his early work. He has held a residency at the Studio Museum in Harlem and his work is included in the Leslie-Lohman Museum of Gay and Lesbian Art.

In addition he has published several artists books and editions with Printed Matter, Inc and has maintained a professional relationship with its former executive director (2004-2010) AA Bronson. Since 2004, Sepuya has shot editorial features for I.D. (magazine), Kaiserin Magazine, and BUTT Magazine. His evolving collection of the self-published periodical 'SHOOT' has been sold internationally since its inception in 2005. Sepuya's 2010 publication, "The Accidental Egyptian and Occidental Arrangements," co-created with artist Timothy Hull, was financed through crowdfunding.

Sepuya is represented by DOCUMENT, Chicago; Yancey Richardson Gallery, New York; Stevenson Gallery, Cape Town. His work is featured in various exhibitions such as the Museum of Contemporary Art, Los Angeles, The Studio Museum in Harlem, Franklin Art Works, Minneapolis, the Artist Institute in New York, and The Center for Photography at Woodstock. He has had solo exhibitions at DOCUMENT, Platform Centre for Photography and Digital Arts in Winnipeg, Clough-Hanson Gallery at Rhodes College in Memphis, Artspeak in Vancouver, and Blaffer Art Museum in Houston.

Predominantly New York-based through 2014, he is currently visiting faculty at CalArts, School of Art, Program in Photography and Media.

Four of his photos are in the collection of MoMA, and he was included in their Spring 2018 show "New Photography".  As of 2018, he was represented by Team Gallery and his first solo exhibition there titled The Conditions, debuted in March 2019.

Sepuya's work was included in the 79th Whitney Biennial, in 2019. Sepuya's work, Darkroom Mirror (_2070386) (detail), 2017, from the series “Darkroom Mirrors,” 2017 was featured on the cover of the ArtForum Magazine's March 2019 Issue.

Critical reception 
Sepuya's work is generally critically acclaimed by art critics and enthusiasts. His work is distinctive in a sense that critics acknowledge his effective use of body fragmentation portraiture techniques.

A contributor writer from The Brooklyn Rail, explains how one of Sepuya's exhibits called the Mirror Study (2016), "has lingered with him the most" in that "the photographer captures himself photographing a cut-up portrait of a man taped to a mirror, hiding the camera and all but his arms behind what remains of the printed image (only the man’s arm)".

An art critic from the May 2017, Fine Arts section issue of The Nation states that Sepuya's photographs are "as insistently reflective and formally refined as any being made today, can nonetheless proclaim that in his work, the sum total of content lies outside of the conversation about art". Sepuya "almost too perfectly encapsulates the current tendency to see photography as a game of mirrors. Its conceptually self-questioning strategies and fastidious-almost-to-the-point-of-finicky aesthetics account, in part, for why he seems to be a must-have artist of the moment", the art critic exclaims when mentioning Sepuya's proven track record.

See also
AA Bronson
Slava Mogutin

References

External links
 

1982 births
Living people
American photographers
African-American artists
African-American contemporary artists
American contemporary artists
Tisch School of the Arts alumni
University of California, Los Angeles alumni